This is a list of music areas in the United States. To some degree, every state can be said to constitute a music area, as well as many large metropolitan areas, rural regions and even individual neighborhoods or boroughs within a city.

References

Cultural geography
American music-related lists
Music areas